Boris Pandža (born 15 December 1986) is a Bosnian professional footballer who plays as a defender for 1. HNL club Šibenik.

He is also a former member of the Bosnia and Herzegovina national team.

Club career
A player who plays in solely defense, Pandža started his youth career at hometown club Zrinjski Mostar before moving to Široki Brijeg, where he started his professional career.

After two-years at the club, he joined Croatian side Hajduk Split in January 2006, but the move was completed in late-2006 and the fee was worth about €200,000 on a four and a half year contract. After spending two season limited in the first team, Pandža started to be used more regularly under the management of Ante Miše. On 17 May 2009, he scored his first goal for the club, in a 2–0 victory against Šibenik. After an impressive display at the club, he attracted interests from Premier League side Stoke City. Upon his departure from Hajduk, Pandža said he wasn't sorry for leaving the club.

In July 2010, he joined Belgium side Mechelen as a replacement for Jonas Ivens on a three-year contract, with the fee of €350,000. Pandža made his debut for the opening game of the season, in a 2–0 win over Lokeren on 31 July 2010 and then scored his first goal for the club, in a 2–1 win over Zulte Waregem one week after his debut. He then scored his second goal, in a 1–0 win over Standard Liège on 17 September 2010 and third goal came on 1 October 2010, in a 2–2 draw against Genk. In his first full season at the club, Pandža scored four goals in thirty-seven appearances in all competitions. His second season was more enjoyable, scoring the club's first goal of the season, as they beat Sint-Truidense 2–1 on 30 July 2011. He then scored another on 25 January 2012, in a 3–2 win over Genk. In his second season at the club, Pandža scored two goals in thirty-one appearances in all competitions. His last season with the club saw him stay at the club after his scheduled move to Arsenal Kyiv collapsed following a failure to meet Pandža's requirements. However, it went appalling for Pandža when he sustained a knee injury, in a 2–0 loss against Beerschot on 1 September 2012 and was out for four weeks. However, it was announced furthermore that he was to be out for 6 months with an injury that could miss the rest of the season. His knee surgery was a success. After three years at the club, Pandža left the club upon after hid contract expired. Upon leaving Mechelen, he expressed "disappointment" for leaving the club.

In July 2013, Pandža was linked with a move to Scottish League One side Rangers. He then began talks with the club over possibly joining Rangers. He himself pleaded to Rangers, quoting: "come and get him" and even willing to risk his wages. Despite the expected agreement which lasted for two months, the move appeared to be stalled. The move was stalled, which was believed to put on hold by the club's chief executive Craig Mather and Pandža would later accuse the club of lacking professionalism for shattering his move to Rangers.

Despite a shattered move to Rangers, he joined Polish side Górnik Zabrze on a one-year contract with an option to extend it. However, after making only thirteen appearances in all competitions, Pandža was released by the club after one season.

He then returned to Široki Brijeg for the 2014–15 season, making 17 appearances as the club finished in 4th place. The following season, Pandža managed just 9 league appearances. After Široki Brijeg, he also played at Čelik Zenica and Croatian club Šibenik.

International career
Pandža was part of the Bosnia and Herzegovina under-21 national team together with players like Edin Džeko, Vedad Ibišević and Sejad Salihović. He captained the team on a few occasions. He received his first senior call up for a game against Norway on 18 March 2007. He made his international debut on 2 June 2007 against Turkey in a 3–2 win. He then became a regular member of the squad.

In May 2014, Pandža was left out of the final squad for the 2014 FIFA World Cup.

On 5 September 2014, he announced his retirement from the Bosnia and Herzegovina national team.

Honours
Hajduk Split
Croatian Cup: 2009–10

Široki Brijeg
Bosnian Cup: 2016–17

Šibenik
2. HNL: 2019–20

References

External links

Boris Pandža profile at Nogometni Magazin 

1986 births
Living people
Sportspeople from Mostar
Croats of Bosnia and Herzegovina
Bosnia and Herzegovina footballers
Bosnia and Herzegovina under-21 international footballers
Bosnia and Herzegovina international footballers
Bosnia and Herzegovina expatriate footballers
Association football defenders
NK Široki Brijeg players
HNK Hajduk Split players
K.V. Mechelen players
Górnik Zabrze players
NK Čelik Zenica players
HNK Šibenik players
Expatriate footballers in Croatia
Expatriate footballers in Belgium
Expatriate footballers in Poland
Premier League of Bosnia and Herzegovina players
Ekstraklasa players
Belgian Pro League players
Croatian Football League players
First Football League (Croatia) players
Bosnia and Herzegovina expatriate sportspeople in Croatia
Bosnia and Herzegovina expatriate sportspeople in Belgium
Bosnia and Herzegovina expatriate sportspeople in Poland